Cooks Run may refer to:

Cooks Run (Rattail Branch), a stream in Ohio
Cooks Run (Neshaminy Creek tributary), a stream in Pennsylvania
Cooks Run, Pennsylvania, an unincorporated community in Clinton County, Pennsylvania